Kihoto Hollohon Yepthomi (15 April 1932 – 15 October 2021) was a politician from Nagaland, India. He was elected to the Nagaland Legislative Assembly three times from Aghunato-34 A/C, three times from Dimapur III A/C and one time from Ghaspani-II. Altogether, he sat as a member of the legislative assembly from 1977 to 2013.

Early life
Kihoto Hollohon Yepthomi was born on 15 April 1932. His mother and father were Zhekheli and Kiyezhe Yepthomi of Khukishe village. He did his schooling from Sukhalu and Zünheboto LP school, Tokiye UP school, Satakha ME and Government High School, Shillong.

Political career
Hollohon served in the Naga Home Guard and held a high rank in the Naga Underground Movement. He later became an inspector in the Nagaland Armed Police but resigned. He served as the President of Zünheboto Sadar in 1968, Joint Secretary UDF and UDF Central Committee. He was elected as RCM representing Satoi Tokiye region for three years.

He first contested state elections in 1977 as United Democratic Front (UDF) candidate and was elected to the Assembly from Aghunato constituency in Zünheboto District. He was re-elected from the same constituency in 1982 and 1987.

In 1989, he won elections from Dimapur-III.

He continued to be elected from Dimapur-III for subsequent terms till 2003, except in 1998, when heeding the call ‘Solution, Not Election’, he decided not to contest the assembly elections.

In 2008, he was elected as the MLA from Ghaspani-II constituency.

In 2013, Hollohon retired from active politics.

Personal life

Attempted assassination

On 25 December 1996, while returning from Christmas service Hollohon's wife, daughter, granddaughter and grandson were killed in a car bomb blast triggered from remote control by the NSCN-IM in an attempted assassination of Hollohon and his family in the Ara Mile neighbourhood of Dimapur. Hollohon escaped as he was not in the vehicle. In the blast his wife Vitoli, his daughter Nishela, 
grand-daughter Hollotoli and grand-son Ninoto (2 year old) were all killed on the spot.

Death
Hollohon died on 15 October 2021 at a private hospital in Dimapur due to age-related illness.

References

1932 births
2021 deaths
Nagaland MLAs 1977–1982
Nagaland MLAs 1982–1987
Nagaland MLAs 1987–1988
Nagaland MLAs 1989–1992
Nagaland MLAs 1993–1998
Nagaland MLAs 1998–2003
Nagaland MLAs 2003–2008
Nagaland MLAs 2008–2013
People from Zünheboto district